José Manuel Boronda (September 5, 1803 – July 24, 1878), was the first ranchero settler in Carmel Valley, California. He and Vicente Blas Martínez were given the  Rancho Los Laureles Mexican land grant in present-day Monterey County, California on September 20, 1839, by Governor Juan Alvarado. Many of the Boronda historic sites still exist, including the Los Laureles Lodge, Carmel Valley Village, Road-Boronda Road Eucalyptus Tree Row, Manuel Boronda Adobe (1817), José Manuel Boronda Adobe, and the Jose Eusebio Boronda Adobe.

Early life 

José Manuel Boronda Jr. was born on September 5, 1803, in San Jose, California. His father was Captain José Manuel Borunda Sr. (1750-1826) and his mother was Maria Gertrudis Higuera (1776-1851). Her parents from Sinaloa, Mexico, had settled in Monterey, California. The senior Boronda was born in Zacatecas, Mexico in 1750. He was a corporal in the Spanish Army and went with Junípero Serra on his second expedition to Alta California. By 1790, he was put on duty at the Presidio of San Francisco. When he retired he and his family moved to Monterey, where he built the three-room Boronda Adobe in 1817, which is the oldest remaining adobe residence in Monterey. He conducted Monterey's first school for boys at this adobe.

The three sons of Manuel and Gertrudis Boronda were: José Canuto Boronda (1792-1882), grantee of Rancho Potrero de San Luis Obispo; José Manuel Boronda Jr. (1803-1878), grantee of Rancho Los Laureles; José Eusebio Boronda (1808-1880) grantee of Rancho Rincon de Sanjon.. 

José Manuel Boronda Jr., married Maria Inocencia Lidia Cota (1805–1894) on May 2, 1821, at San Carlos Cathedral in Monterey. Juana was born on December 28, 1805, in Santa Barbara, California. She was the daughter of Manuel Antonio Cota (1779-1826) and Maria Gertrudis Romero (1781–1817). The Boronda's had 15 children in 25 years.

Rancho Rincón de Sanjón 

José Eusebio Boronda was the second son of José Manuel Sr. and Maria Boronda. He married Maria Josefa Buelna (1817-1864) on September 5, 1831. Maria Buelna was the daughter of Antonio Buelna, grantee of Rancho San Francisquito and Rancho San Gregorio. Boronda served as Mayordomo (Butler) of Rancho Los Vergeles. In 1839, Boronda and his family settled on a one and one half square league, Rancho Rincón del Sanjón which he called San José, and which he was granted in 1840. He built the Jose Eusebio Boronda Adobe in Salinas in 1846. The adobe was listed on the National Register of Historic Places in 1973, and is a California Historical Landmark.

Rancho Potrero de San Luis Obispo

José Canuto Boronda was a soldier at Monterey and Mission San Antonio, San Miguel and San Juan Bautista. He married Maria Francisca Castro (1799-1830) and they had nine children. He received the Rancho Potrero de San Luis Obispo land grant in about 1842. His daughter Maria Concepcion Boronda (1820-1906) received the patent in 1870.

Professional life

Rancho Los Laureles

Governor Juan Alvarado was generous to the Borondas. The name Los Laureles comes from the California Bay Laurel tree. It was bordered to the east by the Rancho Tularcitos, near today's Carmel Valley Village, and on the west by the James Meadows Tract, near Garland Ranch Regional Park.

In 1840, José and Maria settled at Rancho Los Laureles, the first ranchero to setup a permanent residence in Carmel Valley. The family farmed and raised cattle, horses, chickens, and ran a dairy. They grew tomatoes, chilies, and squash. The only neighbors were Domingo Peralta and his wife Maria Loreta Onésimo (1819–1892), who were Rumsen-Esselen Native Americans. After Loretta's husband died, she married James Meadows, who had the adjacent Meadows Tract. 

Juana was the first to bring Spanish cheese to Carmel Valley, called Queso del País, which in Spanish means "cheese of the county." She used a Spanish original recipe to make her white-yellow cheese. David Jacks is credited as being the first to market and popularize what was named Monterey Jack cheese.

With the cession of California to the United States following the Mexican-American War, the 1848 Treaty of Guadalupe Hidalgo provided that the land grants would be honored. As required by the California Land Act of 1851, a claim for Rancho Los Laureles was filed with the Public Land Commission in 1853, and the grant was patented to José M. Boronda and his son, Juan de Mata Boronda (1822-1901) in 1866. In 1851, the Borondas purchased Vicente Blas Martinez and his wife's half-interest in Rancho Los Laureles.

In 1868, the Borondas sold Rancho los Laureles for $12,000, to Elihu Avery, who sold it to Ezekiel Tripp in 1874. Nathan W. Spaulding, later Oakland 's fifteenth Mayor, purchased a half interest on April 27, 1874. 

Spaulding operated the property from 1874-1881. His brother-in-law, Kinzea Klinkenbeard, was appointed as manager and built what became the Los Laureles Lodge. In 1882, the Pacific Improvement Company (PIC) purchased Rancho Los Laureles and hired William Hatton as manager. In 1919, PIC sold their holdings, including Los Laureles, to Samuel FB Morse, and his Del Monte Properties, who offered the land to wealthy developers.

Boronda Adobe

José and Maria Boronda lived in a three-room adobe house, built by the mission Indians, near the Carmel River, from 1840 to 1868. The Boronda Adobe is the oldest building in Carmel Valley having been built ca. 1833. It had three rooms, dirt floors, and a thatched roof (unlike the Boronda adobe in Salinas). A second story was added by the Borondas. 

In 1890, William Hatton managed the Hatton Upper Dairy on the old Rancho Los Laureles. Guests from the Hotel Del Monte would visit the Los Laureles lodge on the property to ride, hunt, and explore the trails. Hatton modernized the diary operations at the old Boronda adobe, adding Durham cattle to the Holsteins that increased the milk butterfat content. Large vats and presses were installed to manufacture Monterey Jack cheese. 

By the 1930s the Boronda adobe had fallen into disrepair and was used to house cattle. In 1947, George Sims purchased the adobe and restored the home and grounds and lived on the property until 1960. It can be seen today on Boronda Road in Carmel Valley. Today, the adobe is a private home and is not open to the public.

Rancho Ex-Mission Soledad

Rancho Ex-Mission Soledad was a  land grant in the Salinas Valley, in present-day Monterey County, California. It was given in 1845 by Governor Pío Pico to Feliciano Soberañes (1788-1868). Francisco Soberañes married Ysabel Boronda (1827-1887), daughter of José Manuel Boronda. Soberanes's daughter, Maria Josefa Soberanes, was granted Rancho Los Coches in 1841. Feliciano's son, Francisco Maria Soberañes (1818-1887), was granted the eleven square league Rancho Sanjon de Santa Rita in 1841.

Death

José Boronda died of a heart attack on July 24, 1878, in Castroville, California, at the age of 74. His funeral was attended by large number of people. He was buried at the Castroville Public Cemetery in Moss Landing, California.

Legacy

The Boronda legacy remains strong today in the Boronda historic sites, including:

 Los Laureles Lodge, 313 West Carmel Valley Road, Carmel Valley
 Road-Boronda Road Eucalyptus Tree Row, Boronda Road, Carmel Valley 
 Manuel Boronda Adobe (1817), 100 Boronda Road, Monterey
 José Manuel Boronda Adobe, Boronda Road, Carmel Valley
 Jose Eusebio Boronda Adobe (1844), 333 Boronda Road, Salinas

Gallery

See also
 Timeline of Carmel-by-the-Sea, California
 Ranchos of California
 List of ranchos of California

References

External links

 The Rancho Los Laureles Grant

1803 births
1878 deaths
People from Carmel Valley, California
People from San Jose, California